The Dieppe Company  was a 17th-century French overseas trading company. It was founded on 1 June 1604 through the issuance of letter patents by Henry IV to Dieppe merchants, with an eye to Far East trade possibilities. The establishment of the company gave the merchants exclusive rights (within France, at least) to the Asian trade for 15 years, but ultimately no trading expeditions were mounted by the company under this name.

Following the king's death in 1610, the charter was renewed in 1611 for a period of 12 years. The company remained inactive however during the troubles of the regency of Marie de Medicis, and other cities such as Rouen maneuvered to also obtain trading rights. In 1615, Marie de Medicis caused the different parties to be joined into the Company of the Moluccas, with trading privileges for 18 years.

In 1616, two expeditions were dispatched to Asia from Honfleur in Normandy: three ships left for India, and two ships for Bantam. One ship returned from Bantam in 1617 with a small cargo, and letters from the Dutch expressing their hostility towards French ships in the East Indies. Also in 1616, two ships were sent from Saint-Malo to Java. One was captured by the Dutch, but the other obtained an agreement from the ruler of Pondicherry to build a fortress and a factory there, and came back with a rich cargo.

In 1619, an armed expedition composed of three ships (275 crew, 106 cannons) was sent from Honfleur, to fight the Dutch in the Far East. They encountered the Dutch fleet off Sumatra. One ship was captured, another remained in Asia for inter-country trade, and the third returned to Le Havre in 1622.

In 1624, the Treaty of Compiègne was negotiated by French Cardinal Richelieu and Dutch ambassadors. It agreed that French and Dutch forces would cease fighting the French in the Far East.

See also

 List of trading companies

Notes

Trading companies of France
1604 establishments in France
Defunct companies of France
Dieppe